Acoria District is one of nineteen districts of the Huancavelica Province in Peru.

Geography 
Other mountains are listed below:

Ethnic groups 
The people in the district are mainly Indigenous citizens of Quechua descent. Quechua is the language which the majority of the population (79.44%) learnt to speak in childhood, 20.35% of the residents started speaking using the Spanish language (2007 Peru Census).

See also 
 Llaqta Qulluy

References